Libuň is a municipality and village in Jičín District in the Hradec Králové Region of the Czech Republic. It has about 800 inhabitants.

Administrative parts
Villages of Březka, Jivany and Libunec are administrative parts of Libuň.

References

Villages in Jičín District